Jindřichov may refer to places in the Czech Republic:

Jindřichov (Bruntál District), a municipality and village in the Moravian-Silesian Region
Jindřichov (Přerov District), a municipality and village in the Olomouc Region
Jindřichov (Šumperk District), a municipality and village in the Olomouc Region
Jindřichov, a village and part of Cheb in the Karlovy Vary Region
Jindřichov (Lučany nad Nisou), a village and part of Lučany nad Nisou in the Liberec Region
Jindřichov, a village and part of Velká Bíteš in the Vysočina Region

See also
Jindřichovice (disambiguation)